The 1972 edition of the Campeonato Carioca kicked off on February 23, 1972 and ended on September 7, 1972. It was organized by FCF (Federação Carioca de Futebol, or Carioca Football Federation). Twelve teams participated. Flamengo won the title for the 16th time. no teams were relegated.

System
The tournament would be divided in four stages:
 Taça Guanabara: The twelve teams all played in a single round-robin format against each other. The champions qualified to the Final phase. The eight best teams qualified to the Second round.
 Taça Fadel Fadel: The remaining eight teams all played in a single round-robin format against each other. The champions qualified to the Final phase.
 Taça José de Albuquerque: The eight teams all played in a single round-robin format against each other. The champions qualified to the Final phase.
Final phase: The three stage winners played in a single round-robin format against each other. the team with the most points won the title.

Championship

Taça Guanabara

Taça Fadel Fadel

Taça José de Albuquerque

Final phase

References

Campeonato Carioca seasons
Carioca